The Campeonato de Portugal (Portuguese for 'Championship of Portugal') is the fourth level of the Portuguese football league system. Together with the third-tier Liga 3, it is organized by the Portuguese Football Federation (FPF).

The Campeonato de Portugal was introduced in 2013 as the new third-level championship, under the name Campeonato Nacional de Seniores (Seniors National Championship), replacing both the Segunda Divisão and Terceira Divisão (former third and fourth divisions, respectively). On 22 October 2015, it adopted its current naming. 
With the creation of the Liga 3 as the new third division from the 2021–22 season, the Campeonato de Portugal was demoted one level.

Format
The first season, 2013–14, was contested by a total of 80 clubs, which included 19 teams from the District Championships, 39 from the Segunda Divisão, 19 from the Terceira Divisão and three teams relegated from the Segunda Liga during the 2012–13 season. In 2017–18, the format consisted of five series of eighteen teams, arranged according to geographic criteria, with the exception of teams from Madeira (placed in the first series) and from the Azores (placed in the last two series). The competition played with four groups of 18 teams in 2018–19 and the curtailed 2019–20 season. It has been played with eight groups of 12 in 2020–21, then it was reduced to five of 10 and one group of 11 teams in 2021–22 season.

Seasons - league tables

List of champions

Performance by club

References

External links
 Official webpage 

Campeonato de Portugal (league)
4
Recurring sporting events established in 2013
Port
2013 establishments in Portugal